Galomecalpa meridana is a species of moth of the family Tortricidae. It is found in Venezuela, Ecuador (Napo Province) and Peru.

The length of the forewings is 12 mm. The ground colour of the forewings is pale whitish yellow with faint brown marbling. The hindwings are cream white with faint light grey-brown marbling.

Etymology
The species name refers to the province of Mérida, Venezuela.

References

Moths described in 2004
Euliini
Moths of South America
Taxa named by Józef Razowski